Contemporary Whitehead Studies (CWS) is an interdisciplinary book series that publishes manuscripts from scholars with contemporary and innovative approaches to Whitehead studies. By publishing innovative and adventurous approaches to Whitehead’s philosophy that engage with the problems, promise, and ideas of the twenty-first century, Contemporary Whitehead Studies creates a vital and dynamic space for scholarly engagement. 
 
The book series was founded in 2009 with Rodopi as a special series in the Value Inquiry Book Series. In 2011 the series moved to Lexington Books, an imprint of Rowman & Littlefield.

Editors
 Roland Faber, Ph.D., Claremont School of Theology and Claremont Graduate University, USA
 Brian G. Henning, Ph.D., Gonzaga University, USA

Mission
CWS especially seeks projects that:
 explore the connections between Whitehead and contemporary continental philosophy, especially sources, like Heidegger, or contemporary streams like poststructuralism,
 reconnect Whitehead to pragmatism, analytical philosophy and philosophy of language, as a matter of source and recourse for an understanding of the tradition out of which Whitehead formulated his philosophic concepts or as a matter of engagement in areas that have excluded Whitehead,
 explore creative East/West dialogues facilitated by Whitehead’s work,
 explore the interconnections of the mathematician with the philosopher and the contemporary importance of these parts of Whitehead's work for the dialogue between sciences and humanities,
 reconnect Whitehead to the wider field of philosophy, the humanities, the sciences and academic research with Whitehead's pluralistic impulses in the context of a pluralistic world,
 address Whitehead’s philosophy (and, per example, of philosophy per se) in the midst of contemporary problems facing humanity, such as climate change, war & peace, race, and the future development of civilization.

Affiliated Project
Contemporary Whitehead Studies is affiliated with the Whitehead Research Project.

Volumes
 # 1. Beyond Metaphysics? Explorations in Alfred North Whitehead’s Late Thought, Edited by Roland Faber, Brian G. Henning, and Clinton Combs (2010).  E-
 # 2. Butler on Whitehead, Edited by Roland Faber, Michael Halewood, and Deena Lin (2012). 
 # 3. The Divine Manifold, Roland Faber (2014). . E-.
 # 4. Foundations of Relational Realism: A Topological Approach to Quantum Mechanics and the Philosophy of Nature, Michael Epperson and Elias Zafaris (2015). . E-.
 # 5. Thinking with Whitehead and the American Pragmatists Experience and Reality, Brian G. Henning, William T. Myers, and Joseph D. John (2015). . E-.
 # 6. Creaturely Cosmologies Why Metaphysics Matters for Animal and Planetary Liberation, Brianne Donaldson (2015). . E-.
 # 7. Tragic Beauty in Whitehead and Japanese Aesthetics, Steve Odin (2016). . E-.
 # 8. Beyond Whitehead: Recent Advances in Process Thought, Jakub Dziadkowiec, Lukasz Lamza (2017). . E-.
 # 9. Whitehead and Continental Philosophy in the Twenty-First Century: Dislocations, Jeremy Fackenthal (2019). . E-.
 # 10. Propositions in the Making: Experiments in a Whiteheadian Laboratory, Roland Faber, Michael Halewood, and Andrew M. Davis (2019). . E-.
 # 11. Whitehead’s Radically Temporalist Metaphysics: Recovering the Seriousness of Time, George Allan (2020). . E-.
 # 12. Mind, Value, and Cosmos: On the Relational Nature of Ultimacy, Andrew M. Davis (2020). . E-.
 # 13. Untying the Gordian Knot: Process, Reality, and Context, Timothy E. Eastman (2020). . E-.
 # 14. On Philosophy, Intelligibility, and the Ordinary: Going the Bloody Hard Way, Randy Ramal (2021).  . E-.

References

External links
 Whitehead Research Project website
 Contemporary Whitehead Studies page on the publisher's website

21st-century philosophy
Alfred North Whitehead